Super Typhoon Emma was a powerful typhoon that brought  winds and  of rain to Okinawa (then US territory of the Ryukyu Islands) and South Korea. Emma left 77 people dead and over $8 million (1956 USD) in damage. Emma was one of several typhoons to cause significant damage to Okinawa during the mid-1950s.

Meteorological history

Forming from a tropical disturbance near the Mariana Islands, Emma churned southwest before gaining typhoon status on September 3. Emma then recurved after reaching Category 3 status. Emma then brushed South Korea and Kyūshū as a strong Category 3 typhoon before swinging to the northeast and hitting China and the far eastern Soviet Union.

Preparations
The Tokyo Weather Center began to issue warnings when Emma was spotted on September 3, east-southeast of Iwo Jima. During the preparations, bread and milk were stocked and U.S. installations in Okinawa were placed on alert. An army hospital in Ryūkyū was evacuated as patients were transferred to storm shelters where they had pie and beans.

Impact
Emma killed 77 people and caused $8–12 million (1956 dollars) in damage across Okinawa and South Korea.

Okinawa
Most heeded typhoon watches, either evacuating or bolting storm shutters and stowing away light equipment. On Okinawa's eastern beaches however, more than a dozen marines who were unaware of the danger came to the beaches eager to surf in the thundering waves. Eleven of the Marines had already paddled out into open water when they realized the danger, but it was too late. A strong rip current had overwhelmed the soldiers and all eleven marines drowned.

When the storm struck, it brought  gusts that ripped apart runways and smashed hangars. Heavy rains brought flashfloods that damaged homes and buildings.  A total of  fell at Kadena Air Force Base in 21 hours on September 8.  By the time Emma left the battered island, there was $8 million (1956 US dollars) in damage.

The U.S.-held island of Okinawa was hard hit by Emma. Numerous planes, runways and barracks were ether damaged or destroyed. The island was in the recovering phases when in 1957, Typhoon Faye, another powerful typhoon did the same damage ($11.3 million (1957 dollars)). Later the island was struck again by Typhoon Charlotte of 1959.

Elsewhere
On Kyūshū, Emma brought 22 inches of rain that caused extensive flooding which left 34 people dead and thousands homeless. At its landfall near South Korea. Emma sank dozens of ships and wrecked homes and buildings. In all 42 people were dead and 35 missing, most of them fishermen.

Loss of a hurricane hunter
Emma was also one of the few tropical cyclones to down a plane. It was a Boeing RB-50 hurricane hunter plane, which was sent up to study wind velocities in the storm's right front quadrant. The plane went down in the storm, taking all 16 crew members with it. Although no direct cause was stated, it was speculated that the winds of the typhoon caused the airplane to go into a tailspin. Another theory was that the low pressures caused the plane's altimeters to give a false reading, and that caused the pilots to assume that they were flying much higher than they actually were, causing them to continue flying on their assumed altitude until they crashed. The theory was also applied to what happened to a hurricane hunter which crashed during Hurricane Janet in 1955.

See also
 Other storms of the same name

Sources

Book
 David Longshore. "Typhoon Emma." Encyclopedia of Hurricanes, Typhoons and Cyclones. David Longshore. New York: Facts on File, 1998, Pg; 113-114.

World Wide Web
 Typhoon Emma Report at the United States Army Center of Military History
 JMA General Information of Typhoon Emma (5612) from Digital Typhoon
 Disaster Information of Typhoon Emma (5612) from Digital Typhoon	
 Unisys (Typhoon Emma track)
 Unisys (Typhoon Emma Best track data from JTWC)

Notes

1956 Pacific typhoon season
Typhoons in Japan
Typhoons in South Korea
Typhoons in Russia
Typhoon Emma
Typhoons